Kim Yong-soo (Korean: 김용수, born May 2, 1960) is a former South Korean baseball pitcher and coach.  Kim was part of the 1984 Olympic team. He won two Korean Series most valuable player awards, and was three times the top saver and once the top winner in the Korea Baseball Organization.

Biography

Kim started his international career at the 1983 Intercontinental Cup. The same year he played the first round of the 1983 draft for MBC Blue Dragons, but did not sign a contract. Next year he took part in the Amateur World Series and 1984 Summer Olympics, where baseball was a demonstration sport. He turned professional in 1985 and played for the Dragons until retiring in 2000. The team changed its name to LG Twins in 1990. Until 2012, he remained a high KBO League scorer in several categories, including saves and saves points (first); number of wins (6th); games pitched, earned run average and innings pitched (8th); and winning percentage (10th).

In retirement, between 2002 and 2009 Kim worked as a pitching coach and scout for the Twins, until becoming the head baseball coach at Chung-Ang University in 2010.

See also 
 List of KBO career win leaders
 List of KBO career saves leaders

References

External links 
Career statistics and player information from Korea Baseball Organization

1960 births
Living people
LG Twins coaches
LG Twins players
Baseball players at the 1984 Summer Olympics
Olympic baseball players of South Korea
South Korean baseball coaches
South Korean baseball players